The Union Nationale des Footballeurs Professionels (UNFP; English: National Union of Professional Footballers) is the main trade union for professional football players in France. It was founded on 16 November 1961 by Eugène N'Jo Léa and Just Fontaine, two footballers, and Jacques Bertrand, a jurist. As of May 2021, the presidents of the UNFP are Philippe Piat and Sylvain Kastendeuch. 

Each month, a trophy is awarded by the UNFP to the best players in Ligue 1 and Ligue 2. At the end of each season, the Trophées UNFP awards the best Ligue 1 and Ligue 2 players, managers and referees of the season. Since 1990, during the summer, the UNFP organizes training sessions for players whose contracts have ended but have not found new teams.

Presidents
1961–1964: Just Fontaine
1964–1969: Michel Hidalgo
1969–2006: Philippe Piat
2006–present: Philippe Piat & Sylvain Kastendeuch

See also
Trophées UNFP du football
UNFP Player of the Month

Footballers in France
Association football trade unions
Trade unions in France
Trade unions established in 1961
Association football player non-biographical articles